Forces Armées et Police Basketball, commonly known as simply FAP or FAP Yaoundé, is a basketball team based in Yaoundé, Cameroon. It is the basketball team of the Cameroonian armed forces and police. The team previously played in the Basketball Africa League (BAL) and domestically plays the Elite Messieurs. FAP has won the national championship three times, the Cameroon Cup once, and the Central Region League Championship three times.

The Yaoundé Multipurpose Sports Complex serves as home arena of the team.

History
The club was established in 1972 in Yaoundé. In November 2019, FAP entered the qualifying tournaments for the newly established Basketball Africa League (BAL), representing Cameroon as runners-up because champions Condor BC refused its invitation. After a good first round run, FAP played even better in the second round. After beating ABC in the semi-finals, FAP qualified for the first edition of the BAL.

In 2020, FAP won its first silverware after winning the Elite Messieurs title. It went unbeaten in the Final Four tournament with a 6–0 record. Ahead of the inaugural BAL season in May 2021, FAP signed Lazare Adingono as head coach. In the following season, FAP repeated as champions.

In the 2022 BAL season, FAP finished in fourth place after eliminating the favoured Rwandan hosts REG in the quarter-finals. The third place game was lost to Zamalek.

Arena

The Yaoundé Multipurpose Sports Complex, built in 2009, is the home arena of FAP Basketball. Most basketball games of the Elite Messieurs final stages are played in the complex.

Honours

Domestic 
Elite Messieurs

 Champions (3): 2019–20, 2020–21, 2021–22
 Runners-up (1): 2018–19

Cameroonian Cup

 Winners (1): 2022

Regional 
Central Region League Championship

 Champions (5): 2011, 2016, 2018, 2021, 2022

International 
Basketball Africa League

 Fourth place (1): 2022
 Quarter-finalist (1): 2021

BAL Qualifying Tournaments

 Winners (1): 2022 (West Division)
 Runners-up (1): 2021 (West Division)

Players

Current roster
The following is the FAP roster for the 2022 BAL season:

Past rosters
2021 BAL season
2022 BAL season

Notable players
 Jordan Rezendes (1 year: 2020)
 Joel Almeida (2 years: 2021–present)
 Alexis Wangmene (1 year: 2022)
 Charles Minlend Jr. (1 year: 2022)
 Ebaku Akumenzoh (2013–15, 2017–present)

Head coaches
 Gilles Kouamo (–2021)
 Lazare Adingono (2021)
 François Enyegue (2021–present)

Performance in the Basketball Africa League

References

External links
Official website
Fap de Yaounde at Afrobasket.com

Basketball teams in Cameroon
Basketball teams established in 1972
Basketball Africa League teams
Sport in Yaoundé
1972 establishments in Cameroon
Road to BAL teams